The Anglo-Mughal War, also known as Child's War,  was the first Anglo-Indian War on the Indian subcontinent.

The English East India Company had been given a monopoly and numerous fortified bases on the western and south-eastern coasts of the Mughal Empire by the Crown, which was permitted by the local governors. In 1682, William Hedges was sent on the behalf of the Company to negotiate with the governor of the proto-industrialised Bengal Subah, Shaista Khan, and to obtain a firman, an imperial directive that would allow the English company regular trading privileges across the Mughal provinces.

In 1685, after some breaking of negotiations by Sir Josiah Child, Bt, the Governor of Bengal reacted by increasing the tributaries of the trade with the north-east from 2% to 3.5%. The company refused the newly introduced taxes and began to try to get the province of Bengal to accept new terms in the favour its trading power and expressed to capture Chittagong, establish a fortified enclave throughout the region, and attain independence of the surrounding subah from the Mughal territory by bringing the local governors and the Hooghly River to their control, which would later allow to form relationships with the Kingdom of Mrauk U based in Arakan (today's Myanmar) and hold substantial power in the Bay of Bengal.

Upon request, King James II sent warships to the company based in India, but the expedition failed. Following the dispatch of twelve warships loaded with troops, a number of battles took place, leading to the Siege of Bombay Harbour and bombardment of the city of Balasore. New peace treaties were negotiated, and the East India Company sent petitions to Aurangzeb about trades involving the Portuguese at Hooghly and religious intolerance of the Tamil community in Madras, but praised Aurangzeb's imperial majesty and compared him with ancient Persia's emperors Cyrus and Darius, however the company eventually failed to reach an agreement.

The English naval forces established a blockade of the Mughal ports on the western Indian coast and engaged in several battles with the Mughal Army, and ships with Muslim pilgrims to Arabia's Mecca were also captured.

The East India Company navy blockaded several Mughal ports on the western coast of India and engaged the Mughal Army in battle. The blockade started to effect major cities like Chittagong, Madras and Mumbai (Bombay), which resulted in the intervention of Emperor Aurangzeb, who seized all the factories of the company and arrested members of the East India Company Army, while the Company forces commanded by Sir Josiah Child, Bt captured further Mughal trading ships.

Ultimately the Company was forced to concede by the armed forces of the Mughal Empire and the company was fined 150,000 rupees (roughly equivalent to today's $4.4 million). The company's apology was accepted and the trading privileges were reimposed by Emperor Aurangzeb.

Background
In 1682 the English East India Company sent William Hedges to Shaista Khan, the Mughal governor of Bengal Subah, in order to obtain a firman: an imperial directive that would grant the Company regular trading privileges throughout the proto-industrialised Mughal Empire, the world's largest economy of that time. After the intervention of the company's governor in London, Sir Josiah Child, with Hedges's mission, causing Emperor Aurangzeb to break off the negotiations. After that Child decided to go to war against the Mughals.

Events
In 1685 Admiral Nicholson was sent out with twelve ships of war, carrying 200 pieces of cannon and a body of 600 men, to be reinforced by 400 from Madras. His instructions were to capture and fortify Chittagong, for which purpose 200 additional guns were placed on board, to demand the cession of the encompassing territory, to conciliate the Zamindars and Taluqdars, to establish a mint, and to enter into a treaty with the ruler of Arakan. But the fleet was dispersed during the voyage, and several of the vessels, instead of steering for Chittagong, entered the Hooghly, and being joined by English troops from Madras, anchored off the Company's factory.

The arrival of so formidable an expedition alarmed Shaista Khan, and he offered to compromise his differences with the English; but an unforeseen event brought the negotiation to an abrupt close. Three English soldiers, strolling through the marketplace of Hooghly, quarrelled with Mughal officials, and were severely beaten. After that Nicholson dispatched a force to capture the town.

In 1686, new negotiations started in Chuttanutty which the Mughals intentionally prolonged till their troops could be assembled to attack the English encampment, and English commander Job Charnock retired with his soldiers and establishments to the island of Ingelee, at the mouth of the Hooghly River. It was a low and deadly swamp, covered with long grass, without any fresh water. In three months 50% of the English troops had died from disease.

In 1688, an English fleet was dispatched to blockade the Mughal harbours in the Arabian Sea on the western coast of India. Merchantmen containing Muslim pilgrims to Mecca (as part of the hajj) were among those captured. Upon hearing of the blockade, Emperor Aurangzeb  decided to resume negotiations with the English. However, the Company sent out reinforcements commanded by Captain Heath who on his arrival disallowed the treaty then pending and proceeded to Balasore which he bombarded unsuccessfully. He then sailed to Chittagong; but finding the fortifications stronger than he had anticipated, landed at Madras.

After that Emperor Aurangzeb issued orders for the occupation of the East India Company possessions all over the subcontinent, and the confiscation of their property. As a result, possessions of East India Company were reduced to the fortified towns of Madras and Bombay.

In 1689, the strong Mughal fleet from Janjira commanded by Sidi Yaqub and composed of Mappila from the Ethiopian Empire blockaded the East India Company fort in Bombay. After a year of resistance, a famine broke out due to the blockade, the Company surrendered, and in 1690 the company sent envoys to Aurangzeb's court to plea for a pardon and to renew the trade firman. The company's envoys had to prostrate themselves before the emperor, pay a large imperial fine of 1,500,000 rupees, and promise better behavior in the future. Emperor Aurangzeb then ordered Sidi Yaqub to lift the Siege of Bombay and the company subsequently re-established itself in Bombay and set up a new base in Calcutta.

See also
Henry Every
Thomas Tew

References

Wars involving the British East India Company
Wars involving the Mughal Empire
1680s in India
1690 in India
1680s in the Mughal Empire
1690 in the Mughal Empire